Procambarus delicatus, sometimes called the big-cheeked cave crayfish, is a species of crayfish in the family Cambaridae. It is endemic to a single spring in the Ocala National Forest, Lake County, Florida.

It is considered Critically Endangered (Possibly Extinct) by the IUCN Redlist, having not been seen since 1976.

References

Cambaridae
Freshwater crustaceans of North America
Endemic fauna of Florida
Cave crayfish
Taxonomy articles created by Polbot
Crustaceans described in 1986
Taxa named by Horton H. Hobbs Jr.